Mario Rivas Viondi (born 27 March 2000) is a Spanish footballer who plays as a forward for CD Leganés B.

Club career
Born in Albacete, Castilla–La Mancha, Rivas was a Getafe CF youth graduate, after starting it out at Atlético Madrid. On 16 July 2019, after finishing his formation, he signed for Tercera División side CD Móstoles URJC.

Rivas made his senior debut on 1 September 2019, playing the last 26 minutes in a 2–1 away win over CF Pozuelo de Alarcón. He scored his first senior goal on 29 November 2020, netting a last-minute equalizer in a 1–1 away draw against CD Leganés B.

On 2 January 2021, Rivas moved to CD Leganés and was assigned to the B-team also in the fourth division. He made his first team debut on 29 October, coming on as a late substitute for Javier Eraso in a 0–1 loss at UD Almería in the Segunda División.

Personal life
Rivas' twin brother Óscar is also a footballer; a defender, he was also groomed at Getafe. Their father Antonio was also a footballer.

References

External links
 
 

2000 births
Living people
Sportspeople from Albacete
Spanish twins
Twin sportspeople
Spanish footballers
Footballers from Castilla–La Mancha
Association football forwards
Segunda División players
Segunda Federación players
Tercera División players
CD Móstoles URJC players
CD Leganés B players
CD Leganés players
Lleida Esportiu footballers